Kashirsky District is an administrative and municipal district (raion), one of the thirty-two in Voronezh Oblast, Russia. It is located in the northwestern central part of the oblast. The area of the district is 106019,9 hectares (409,3 sq mi), as of 2016. Its administrative center is the rural locality (a selo) of Kashirskoye. Population:  The population of Kashirskoye accounts for 18.0% of the district's total population.

See also
40 let Oktyabrya

References

Notes

Sources

Districts of Voronezh Oblast